Dauntless is a free-to-play action role-playing video game developed by Phoenix Labs and published and distributed by Epic Games. The game initially launched in beta in May 2018 for Microsoft Windows. An early access version launched on May 21, 2019 for PlayStation 4, and Xbox One, including full support for cross-platform play, and was fully released for those platforms on September 26, 2019. A Nintendo Switch version was released on December 10, 2019. Versions for PlayStation 5 and Xbox Series X/S were released on December 2, 2021.

Gameplay
Dauntless takes place in a fantasy setting, where a cataclysmic event has torn the world apart, releasing monstrous creatures known as Behemoths that prey on the surviving humans. Players take on the role of Slayers to take down Behemoths, collecting loot that they use to craft and upgrade weapons and equipment as to take down larger and more powerful Behemoths. While hunting, the game plays as a third-person action game; the player uses a combo system to attack the creature, while monitoring their own health and stamina gauge. Such hunts can take upwards of twenty minutes of in-game time to complete. The game can be played both as single-player, cooperatively in a party of up to four or in public cooperative instances of up to six people.

Development
Phoenix Labs was formed by former Riot Games developers Jesse Houston, Sean Bender and Robin Mayne, and as of January 2017 includes 40 developers formerly from BioWare, Blizzard Entertainment, and Capcom. While a small studio compared to the AAA studios they left, Houston said that they are positioned in a way to offer "a new, unique approach to crafting AAA experiences".

Dauntless is the studio's first release. It was heavily inspired, as well as frequently compared to, Capcom's Monster Hunter series, which can see hundreds of hours put into a game by a player; the developers themselves have over a collective 6000 hours in various Monster Hunter titles. Dauntless was also influenced by Dark Souls and World of Warcraft. Houston credits Dark Souls specifically for helping to prove out that there is a market for "hardcore action games" focused on player versus environment encounters, which allowed them to take a safe risk on their approach to Dauntless. The game is intended to be played cooperatively as they see it as a social experience, and intend to add social/multiplayer interactions that are persistent in games like World of Warcraft and Destiny to differentiate Dauntless from the Monster Hunter games. Houston said that they plan to make extremely difficult quests within the game, so that while most players will be able to reach a principle endgame state, only a few will be skilled enough to take on these quests, similar to some quests in World of Warcraft. The game's look and feel was inspired by the animated film Tangled and other Disney films, avoiding hyper-realism so that the game's graphics will age well.

Since its announcement, the game has garnered a great deal of interest from players, prompting Phoenix Labs to be much more transparent about the development plans for the game and interact with their fans to help guide development. They also plan to move the closed alpha sooner by a few months to get more early feedback. They later announced plans to start the alpha testing in April 2017.

The game was first revealed during The Game Awards in December 2016. Phoenix Labs planned to start with a closed alpha period, followed by an open beta period prior to the game's full release in the last quarter of 2017. The alpha was launched August 18, 2017; though players could register to be selected for the alpha, Phoenix Labs also offered premium early alpha access in for-cost packages that included in-game buffs, features for customization, and the ability to create guilds. By the PAX East 2017 event in March 2017, they had the basic combat for the game completed, and were starting the development of the impact of skills and boosts into the game. By September, Phoenix Labs pushed back the release schedule for the game, citing issues found during the closed alpha period including game stability and game balance in comparison to the Monster Hunter formula. The open beta was moved to early 2018, and formally launched in May 2018, though prior to that, they invited small waves of players to the closed beta to increase feedback. Within two weeks of the open beta period, over one million new players had played the game. By July 2018, they had seen over 2 million players.

While there would be microtransactions in the game, the developers plan to limit this to cosmetic items and temporary boosts rather than to require players to access game content. Houston said it was important to them that players shown wearing rare armor or weapons in the game got those through skill and not by "a deep wallet". While initially they had offered cosmetics through loot boxes within the game, the team opted to remove them following criticism towards the growing trend of loot boxes that was raised in October 2017; instead, they allow players to directly purchase cosmetics with real-world funds for monetization purposes. Houston, who had previously worked with Electronic Arts on Mass Effect 3, one of the first games that introduced loot boxes, said that they wanted to give players "a clearer relationship to the content that [they're] purchasing" in their decision to eliminate these. Instead, Phoenix Labs opted to use a battle pass system using Hunt and Season passes, providing a rotating set of cosmetics and emotes.

Dauntless was initially planned for a personal computer-only release, but Phoenix Labs have been in discussions with publishers for consoles, and would like to support cross-platform play if they do publish to these systems. Houston said that his team was not worried about potential competition from Monster Hunter: World, which was announced to be coming in 2018 for personal computers and consoles during the Electronic Entertainment Expo 2017 in June 2017. Houston said "The more AAA products that are coming into this genre, the wider it’s going to get", and believes that Dauntless differs itself by being tuned to a co-operative experience and using free-to-play mechanics. The studio later affirmed in May 2019 that Monster Hunter World had initially dipped some of its player count, but Dauntless has since steadily grown thanks to the interest in this style of game created by the success of Monster Hunter World, and was around 3 million total players at that point.

At The Game Awards 2018 in December 2018, Phoenix Labs affirmed that Dauntless would release for PlayStation 4 and Xbox One in early 2019, and with future plans for a Nintendo Switch and mobile platforms. Phoenix Labs wants to offer a One Dauntless system to players, with their progress being saved through a single account regardless of which platform they play on, as well as for cross-platform play, and worked with Sony and Microsoft to work out these details. By January 2019, Phoenix Labs announced the game would be migrated to the Epic Games Store and into the Store's account systems. This helped Phoenix to support cross-platform play through Epic Games' previous efforts to secure that for Fortnite Battle Royale.

On May 21, 2019, while still in early access, Dauntless was released for PlayStation 4 and Xbox One, as well as transitioned Windows players to the Epic Games Store. Prior to release, Phoenix Labs only had anticipated having cross-platform play between Windows and Xbox One users, as they were still in discussions with Sony on PlayStation 4 cross-platform support, but by May 21, they had secured the approval from Sony. As such, Dauntless is the first game to ship at launch with cross-play between these three major platforms. Within days of launch, the 3-million player base doubled to 6 million, putting initial stress on the game's servers during this period while Phoenix worked to expand server capacity. The game officially left early access on September 26, 2019 with its 1.0 launch and first major expansion "Aether Unbound", with a total of 15 million players at that point.

The Switch version was released on December 10, 2019, and versions for the PlayStation 5 and Xbox Series X/S launched on December 2, 2021. These versions support cross-platform play and progression with Microsoft Windows, PlayStation 4, and Xbox One versions.

Phoenix Labs acquired Bot School Inc. in August 2019 to help with Dauntless support and cross-play features. Phoenix Labs were acquired themselves by Garena in January 2020. The acquirement did not affect normal operation of Phoenix Labs or Dauntless, and served to bolster Garena's international presence. For Phoenix, the acquisition potentially allowed them to develop towards mobile game space.

Reception

Dauntless received tentatively positive reviews at the time of release. Game Informer thought that the core monster hunting gameplay was focused and fun, but warned that advanced players would run out of new content fairly quickly. GameSpot was less enthusiastic, praising the weapon variety and monster design, but criticizing the bugs in the early version of the game and the setting, story, and characters being unfulfilling and not fleshed out.

References

External links
 

2019 video games
Cooperative video games
Fantasy video games
Free-to-play video games
Multiplayer and single-player video games
Nintendo Switch games
PlayStation 4 games
Windows games
Xbox One games
Unreal Engine games
Action role-playing video games
Indie video games
Video games developed in Canada
Video games with cross-platform play